Red fuming nitric acid (RFNA) is a storable oxidizer used as a rocket propellant.  It consists of 84% nitric acid, 13% dinitrogen tetroxide and 1–2% water. The color of red fuming nitric acid is due to the dinitrogen tetroxide, which breaks down partially to form nitrogen dioxide. The nitrogen dioxide dissolves until the liquid is saturated, and produces toxic fumes with a suffocating odor. RFNA increases the flammability of combustible materials and is highly exothermic when reacting with water.

It is usually used with an inhibitor (with various, sometimes secret, substances, including hydrogen fluoride; any such combination is called inhibited RFNA, IRFNA) because nitric acid attacks most container materials. Hydrogen fluoride for instance will passivate the container metal with a thin layer of metal fluoride, making it nearly impervious to the nitric acid.

It can also be a component of a monopropellant; with substances like amine nitrates dissolved in it, it can be used as the sole fuel in a rocket. This is inefficient and it is not normally used this way.

During World War II, the German military used RFNA in some rockets. The mixtures used were called S-Stoff (96% nitric acid with 4% ferric chloride as an ignition catalyst) and SV-Stoff (94% nitric acid with 6% dinitrogen tetroxide) and nicknamed Salbei (sage).

Inhibited RFNA was the oxidizer of the world's most-launched light orbital rocket, the Kosmos-3M.

Other uses for RFNA include fertilizers, dye intermediates, explosives, and pharmaceutic aid as acidifier. It can also be used as a laboratory reagent in photoengraving and metal etching.

Compositions
 IRFNA IIIa: 83.4% HNO3, 14% NO2, 2% H2O, 0.6% HF
 IRFNA IV HDA: 54.3% HNO3, 44% NO2, 1% H2O, 0.7% HF
 S-Stoff: 96% HNO3, 4% FeCl3
 SV-Stoff: 94% HNO3, 6% N2O4
 AK20: 80% HNO3, 20% N2O4
 AK20F: 80% HNO3, 20% N2O4, fluorine-based inhibitor
 AK20I: 80% HNO3, 20% N2O4, iodine-based inhibitor
 AK20K: 80% HNO3, 20% N2O4, fluorine-based inhibitor
 AK27I: 73% HNO3, 27% N2O4, iodine-based inhibitor
 AK27P: 73% HNO3, 27% N2O4, fluorine-based inhibitor

Experiments
 Hydrofluoric acid content of IRFNA When RFNA is used as an oxidizer for rocket fuels, it usually has a HF content of about 0.6%. The purpose of the HF is to act as a corrosion inhibitor.
 Water content of RFNA To test the water content, a sample of 80% HNO3, 8–20% NO2, and the rest H2O depending on the varied amount of NO2 in the sample. When the RFNA contained HF, there was an average H2O% between 2.4% and 4.2%. When the RFNA did not contain HF, there was an average H2O% between 0.1% and 5.0%. When the metal impurities from corrosion were taken into account, the H2O% increased, and the H2O% was between 2.2% and 8.8%
 Corrosion of metals in RFNA Stainless steel, aluminium alloys, iron alloys, chrome plates, tin, gold and tantalum were tested to see how RFNA affected the corrosion rates of each. Experiments were performed using 16% and 6.5% RFNA samples and the different substances listed above. Many different stainless steels showed resistance to corrosion. Aluminium alloys did not endure as well as stainless steels especially in high temperature, but the corrosion rates were not high enough to prohibit the use of this with RFNA. Tin, gold and tantalum showed high corrosion resistance similar to that of stainless steel. These materials are better though because at high temperatures the corrosion rates did not increase much. Corrosion rates at elevated temperatures increase in the presence of phosphoric acid. Sulfuric acid decreased corrosion rates.

See also
 White fuming nitric acid

References

External links
 National Pollutant Inventory – Nitric Acid Fact Sheet
 https://web.archive.org/web/20030429160808/http://www.astronautix.com/props/nitidjpx.htm

Rocket oxidizers
Oxidizing acids